The Medal "For the Capture of Budapest" was a World War II campaign medal of the Soviet Union established on 9 June 1945 by decree of the Presidium of the Supreme Soviet of the USSR to satisfy the petition of the People's Commissariat for Defense of the Soviet Union to recognise and reward the participants of the battle for the capture of the city of Budapest from the armed forces of Nazi Germany.  The medal's statute was amended on 18 July 1980 by decree of the Presidium of the Supreme Soviet of the USSR № 2523-X.

Medal statute 
The Medal "For the Capture of Budapest" was awarded to soldiers of the Red Army, Navy and troops of the NKVD, direct participants of the heroic assault and capture of Budapest as well as to the organizers and leaders of combat operations in the capture of this city. 

Award of the medal was made on behalf of the Presidium of the Supreme Soviet of the USSR on the basis of documents attesting to actual participation in the capture of Budapest.  Serving military personnel received the medal from their unit commander, retirees from military service received the medal from a regional, municipal or district military commissioner in the recipient's community.  

The Medal "For the Capture of Budapest" was worn on the left side of the chest and in the presence of other awards of the USSR, was located immediately after the Medal "For the Victory over Japan".  If worn in the presence of orders or medals of the Russian Federation, the latter have precedence.

Medal description 
The Medal "For the Capture of Budapest" was a 32mm in diameter circular brass medal with a raised rim on the obverse.  On its obverse at the top, a relief five-pointed star, its top point touching the medal's upper rim.  Below the star, the relief inscription in bold letters on two rows "FOR THE CAPTURE OF BUDAPEST".  At the bottom, the relief image of a wreath of oak branches going up the left and right circumference of the medal up to the lower row of the inscription, in the center of the wreath, the relief image of the hammer and sickle.  On the reverse at the top, a relief plain five-pointed star, below the star, the relief date in three rows "13 FEBRUARY 1945".  

The Medal "For the Capture of Budapest" was secured by a ring through the medal suspension loop to a standard Soviet pentagonal mount covered by a 24mm wide silk moiré orange ribbon with an 8mm wide central blue stripe.

Recipients (partial list) 
The individuals below were all recipients of the Medal "For the Capture of Budapest".

Marshal of the Soviet Union Rodion Yakovlevich Malinovsky
Marshal of the Soviet Union Fyodor Ivanovich Tolbukhin
Marshal of the Soviet Union Nikolai Vasilyevich Ogarkov
Marshal of the Soviet Union Vasily Ivanovich Petrov
Colonel General Nikolai Petrovich Kamanin
Sapper Vladimir Fedorovich Chekalov
World War 2 veteran, painter Piotr Konstantinovich Vasiliev
War Correspondent Pyotr Andreyevich Pavlenko
Colonel Ivan Fedorovich Ladyga
Army General Semion Pavlovich Ivanov
Lieutenant General Georgy Timofeyevich Beregovoy
Military photographer Yevgeny Anan'evich Khaldei
Lieutenant General Kuzma Nikolayevich Derevyanko
Actor Georgi Aleksandrovich Yumatov
Chief Marshal of Artillery Mitrofan Ivanovich Nedelin
Lieutenant Grigory Yakovlevich Baklanov
Lieutenant General Vitaly Ivanovich Popkov
Chief Petty Officer Ekaterina Illarionovna Mikhailova-Demina
Soldier Pavel Filimonovichi Tuhari

See also 

Siege of Budapest
Awards and decorations of the Soviet Union

References

External links 
 Legal Library of the USSR

1945 establishments in the Soviet Union
Awards established in 1945
Hungary–Soviet Union relations
Soviet campaign medals